Ljubo Kovačević (born 8 September 1978) is a Serbian football goalkeeper who plays for FK 011 Beograd.

References

External links
 
 Ljubo Kovačević stats at utakmica.rs

1978 births
Living people
Footballers from Belgrade
Association football goalkeepers
Serbian footballers
FK BSK Borča players
FK Radnički Obrenovac players
FK Loznica players
FK Radnički Pirot players
FK Zemun players
FK Donji Srem players
Serbian First League players
Serbian SuperLiga players
Serbian expatriate footballers
Expatriate footballers in Iceland
Ljubo Kovačević
1. deild karla players
Expatriate footballers in North Macedonia
FK Renova players